"You Mean Everything to Me" is a song written and sung by Neil Sedaka.

Background
The song bears similarity to Paul Anka's "You Are My Destiny", and has been covered by many artists in many languages including a Hebrew-language version (written by Chaim Kaynan) which was recorded by Sedaka himself.

Chart performance
It was released in 1960. It became a hit in the US reaching #17 on the US Billboard chart, and No. 2 in Canada.

References

1959 songs
1960 singles
Neil Sedaka songs
Songs written by Neil Sedaka
Songs with lyrics by Howard Greenfield
RCA Victor singles